Zletovo is a village in the municipality of Probištip, North Macedonia. It used to be a municipality of its own and its FIPS code was MK48.

History
One of the neighborhoods of the village bears the name Arvanik, which stems from the Proto-Albanian arb, arban but with the Greek phonetic development rb -> rv and with the suffix ik, resulting in the form Arvanik. The neighborhood was inhabited by an Albanian population and was named in this way by the Byzantine administration.

Demographics
According to the 2002 census, the village had a total of 2,477 inhabitants. Ethnic groups in the village include:

Macedonians 2,471
Serbs 2
Aromanians 1
Others 3

References

Villages in Probištip Municipality